Rokevious P. Watkins (born February 24, 1989) is a former American football offensive lineman. He was drafted by the St. Louis Rams with the 150th pick in the 2012 NFL Draft. Watkins has also played for the Kansas City Chiefs.

High school career 
Watkins attended Creekside High School in Fairburn, Georgia, where he was teammates with Eric Berry and Terrance Parks.

College career 
As a senior at the University of South Carolina, Watkins was named All-SEC First-team by the AP after starting all 12 games in the 2011 season. He was also named SEC Offensive Lineman of the Week after the Gamecocks' season-opener against East Carolina. In 2010, he started all 14 games, playing both guard positions. The previous season, 2009, he redshirted following a transfer from Georgia Military College.

In 2007 and 2008, Watkins played junior college ball at Georgia Military College in Milledgeville.

Professional career

St. Louis Rams 
Watkins was drafted in the fifth round by the St. Louis Rams. As a rookie, Watkins reported to camp overweight and out of shape and was held out of practice for the first several days of practice. He played in one game in 2012, the season opener in Detroit, before being put on the injured reserve. Watkins was released July 24, 2013, after reporting to training camp overweight for the second consecutive season.

Kansas City Chiefs 
On August 3, 2013, Watkins was signed by the Kansas City Chiefs. Watkins was released on July 28, 2014.

Arizona Rattlers
On November 9, 2015, Watkins was assigned to the Arizona Rattlers of the Arena Football League (AFL). On March 9, 2016, Watkins was placed on reassignment.

References

External links 
 
 South Carolina Gamecocks bio

1989 births
Living people
Sportspeople from Fulton County, Georgia
American football offensive guards
American football offensive tackles
South Carolina Gamecocks football players
St. Louis Rams players
Kansas City Chiefs players
People from Fairburn, Georgia
Hudson Valley Fort players
Arizona Rattlers players